Joppolo Giancaxio (or Giancasciu) is a comune (municipality) in the Province of Agrigento in the Italian region Sicily, located about  south of Palermo and about  northwest of Agrigento.

Joppolo Giancaxio borders the following municipalities: Agrigento, Aragona, Raffadali, Santa Elisabetta.

References

Cities and towns in Sicily